The 2020–21 Korn Ferry Tour was the 31st season of the top developmental tour for the PGA Tour in men's golf, and the second under the current sponsored name of Korn Ferry Tour. Originally scheduled to run from January 12 to August 30, it was announced in early May 2020 that due to disruption caused by the COVID-19 pandemic that the in-progress and on-hold 2020 season would be merged with the planned 2021 season.

With the season having been extended through 2021, there were no graduates to the PGA Tour for the 2020–21 season. However the leading 10 players in the Korn Ferry Tour points standings through the 2020 Korn Ferry Tour Championship will be granted exemption to play in four alternate events on the PGA Tour during 2021.

Schedule
The following table lists official events during the 2020–21 season.

Location of tournaments

Points leaders
For full rankings, see 2021 Korn Ferry Tour Finals graduates.

Regular season points leaders
The regular season points list was based on prize money won during the season, calculated using a points-based system. The top 25 players on the tour earned status to play on the 2021–22 PGA Tour.

Finals points leaders
A further 25 players earned status to play on the 2021–22 PGA Tour, via the Korn Ferry Tour Finals.

2021 PGA Tour exemptions
The leading 10 players in the Korn Ferry Tour points list through the 2020 Korn Ferry Tour Championship were granted exemptions to play in the Puerto Rico Open, the Corales Puntacana Resort and Club Championship, the Barbasol Championship and the Barracuda Championship on the PGA Tour during 2021. They were as follows:

Paul Barjon
Lee Hodges
Stephan Jäger
David Lipsky
Taylor Pendrith
Mito Pereira
Davis Riley
Greyson Sigg
Brandon Wu
Will Zalatoris

Awards

Notes

References

External links
Official schedule

Korn Ferry Tour seasons
Korn Ferry Tour
Korn Ferry Tour
Korn Ferry Tour